Threads of Time, an album by Cherish the Ladies, was released in 1998 on the RCA label.

Track listing
 "Rolling in the Barrel/The Pinch of Snuff/Vincent Campbell's/The Galloping Hound (by Siobhan Egan)" – 3:17
 "High Germany" – 4:11
 "Thady Casey's Fancy/The Ladies' Pantalettes/The Monaghan Twig/The Linen Cap (by Joanie Madden)" - 3:34
 "Her Mantle So Green" – 4:44
 "The Ballad of the Foxhunter" – 4:35
 "Liza's Dream (by Donna Long)/The Westside Highway (by Joanie Madden)" – 3:30
 "The Battle of Aughrim/The Star Above the Garter" – 3:09
 "The Lake Isle of Innisfree" – 3:01
 "Tip Toe Home/Paddy Kelly's" – 4:28
 "The Bergen" – 4:25
 "The Anascaul Polka/Pat Enright's/Joe Wilson's (by Joanie Madden)" – 3:22
 "The Bonny Light Horesman" – 5:31
 "Miss Maule's/Alta's Reel (by Donna Long)/The Five of Diamonds (by Joanie Madden)/The Pilltown Reel" – 3:57

References

External links
 Complete identification of album contents at irishtune.info

Cherish the Ladies albums
1998 albums